Hypnodendrales is an order of mosses.

Description
Species in the order are robust pleurocarpous mosses that are epiphytic. They are generally characterized by basally reiterating stems or stipes with secondary branching towards the apex. The order is mostly restricted to the Southern Hemisphere.

Classification
There are four families placed in the Hypnodendrales:
Braithwaiteaceae
Hypnodendraceae
Pterobryellaceae
Racopilaceae

References

Moss orders
Bryopsida